Ariquemes is a municipality located in the Brazilian state of Rondônia. Its population was 109,523 (2020 est.) and its area is 4,427 km2. It is the third-largest city in Rondônia state.

Transportation
The city is served by Ariquemes Airport.

References

External links
 

Municipalities in Rondônia